Coral vine is a common name shared by two plants:
 Kennedia coccinea,  species of flowering plant in the family Fabaceae, endemic to the south-west of  Western Australia.
 Antigonon leptopus, a perennial in the buckwheat family (Polygonaceae) native to Mexico.